You Have No Idea What You're Getting Yourself Into is the debut album from Does It Offend You, Yeah?. It was released on March 24, 2008.

Track listing 

All tracks were written and recorded by Does It Offend You, Yeah? except tracks 2 and 7 which were co-written with Eliot James and Sebastien Grainger respectively.

Personnel 

 James Rushent – lead vocals, bass, guitar, synth, vocoder
 Rob Bloomfield – drums, bass, guitar, synth, backing vocals
 Dan Coop – synth
 Sebastien Grainger – vocals on "Let's Make Out"
 Elliot James – guitar
 Morgan Quaintance – guitar on "Doomed Now"

Usage in popular culture 

 "Attack of the 60 ft Lesbian Octopus" was played during the 81st Academy Awards on February 22, 2009, over a montage of 2008 animated films.
 "Dawn of the Dead" was used in the 2008 series of the UK's Big Brother as the backing track to Mikey "the blind guy's" best bits which was played on the finale.
 "We Are Rockstars" is featured in trailers for Fast & Furious.
 "We Are Rockstars" is featured as the soundtrack in the VW GTI Project online game.
 "We Are Rockstars" is also featured as the theme song for Home and Garden Network TV.
 "We Are Rockstars" is featured in the game Saints Row 2 on the station K12 97.6.
 "We Are Rockstars" is the theme song for the sketch show Horne and Corden.
 "Epic Last Song" is featured in episode 2390 of Hollyoaks, when John Paul follows first love Craig to the train station and they ride off into the sunset together.
 "Battle Royale" is included in The Sims 2 expansion Apartment Life as part of the soundtrack.
 "Battle Royale" is on the EA Sports FIFA Street 3 soundtrack.
 "With A Heavy Heart (I Regret To Inform You)" was featured in the game Gran Turismo 5 Prologue
 "With A Heavy Heart (I Regret To Inform You)" is featured in preview ads for the upcoming FOX drama Human Target.
 "With A Heavy Heart (I Regret To Inform You)" was featured in episode 18 of season 2 in Gossip Girl, when Dan and Miss Carr have sex in the dark.

Production 

 Producers: Does It Offend You, Yeah?, Eliot James
 Mix: Rich Costey

Charts

References 

Does It Offend You, Yeah? albums
2008 debut albums
Startime International albums
Virgin Records albums